The 2nd Light Mechanized Division was a French Army division  active during the Second World War.

Second World War

Battle Of France
During the Battle of France in May 1940, the division contained the following units:

3rd Light Mechanized Brigade
13th Dragoon Armoured Regiment
29th Dragoon Armoured Regiment
4th Light Mechanized Brigade
4th Dragoon Mechanized Infantry Regiment
8th Cuirassier Reconnaissance Cavalry Regiment
71st Artillery Regiment

References

Light Mechanized Division, 2nd